The IAR-821 was an agricultural aircraft built in Romania in the 1960s. It was a conventional low-wing monoplane with fixed, tailwheel undercarriage.

Development

The IAR-821 is an agricultural crop sprayer and duster aircraft. The design was completed under the leadership of eng. Radu Manicatide in 1967, at IMFCA Bucharest (Institutul de Mecanica Fluidelor si Cercetari Aerospatiale - Institute of Fluid Mechanics and Aerospace Research). It was built at IRMA (Intreprinderea de Reparatii Material Aeronautic - Enterprise for Aeronautical Material Repairement), in Bucharest. A small series of 20 aircraft was produced in 1968 and 1969, plus a single example of a trainer aircraft designated IAR-821B that had a second cockpit installed in place of the IAR-821's chemical tank, and was equipped with a new chemical tank of smaller capacity. It was intended that this aircraft should equip Romanian flying schools from 1969, but this did not happen.

Design

A low-wing monoplane, it featured mixed wood-metal structure, with the fuselage and wing roots built from welded chrome-molybdenum tube, and the outer wings and tail unit from wood. The front fuselage had aluminium panels, while the rest of the surface was plywood covered with fabric. The propulsion was provided by an Ivchenko AI-14 RF, a single row air-cooled 9-cylinder radial capable of delivering 300 hp (221 kW), located at the apex of the front fuselage contained in a NACA cowling and combined with a three blade propeller with fixed pitch.

Variants

IAR-821AMonoplace agricultural crop sprayer and duster aircraft

IAR-821BBiplace trainer aircraft with smaller capacity chemical tank

Operators

Romanian Utilitary Aviation - the only operator of the IAR-821

Specifications (IAR-821)

References

External links 
 Iar 821 at airwar.ru 
 

1960s Romanian agricultural aircraft
821
Aircraft first flown in 1967
Low-wing aircraft
Single-engined tractor aircraft